Danville West Market Street Historic District is a national historic district located in Danville, Montour County, Pennsylvania. It encompasses 42 contributing buildings in a residential area of Danville.  The buildings date from about 1800 to 1925.  The houses are mostly of brick and frame construction, with some log and stone dwellings, and in a variety of architectural styles including Italianate, Federal, Queen Anne and Second Empire.

It was added to the National Register of Historic Places in 1985.  In 1994, it was incorporated into the Danville Historic District.

References

Historic districts on the National Register of Historic Places in Pennsylvania
Buildings and structures in Montour County, Pennsylvania
National Register of Historic Places in Montour County, Pennsylvania